John "Howie" Schumm (March 11, 1940 – April 4, 2015) was a Canadian football player with the Canadian Football League's Edmonton Eskimos and the Calgary Stampeders. Schumm spent his 14-year CFL career as a linebacker and fullback for the Eskimos and Stampeders. On defense, he intercepted 12 passes, 2 for touchdowns, and recovered 5 fumbles. On offense, he was mostly a blocker, as his best rushing season was 1961 with only 86 yards. He was also a punt and kick returner, in particular returning 47 punts for 250 yards (5.3 average) in 1964 and 50 punts for 199 yards (4.0 average) in 1965.

Schumm did not miss a single game in the first 8 years of his career, from 1959 to 1966. His brother Herb Schumm also played in the CFL. He died of cancer in 2015.

References

External links
Eskimos All-Time Team

1940 births
2015 deaths
Calgary Stampeders players
Canadian football linebackers
Edmonton Elks players
People from Spruce Grove
Players of Canadian football from Alberta